Lumière is French for 'light'.

Lumiere, Lumière or Lumieres may refer to:

Lumières, the philosophical movement in the Age of Enlightenment

People
Auguste and Louis Lumière, French pioneers in film-making

Film and TV
 Institut Lumière, a French organization for the preservation of French cinema
 Lumière (film), 1976 French drama film
 Lumiere (database), an online database of admission results for films released in Europe
Lumières Award, an annual French film awards ceremony
 Lumiere TV, a premium television service available in Cyprus, that broadcasts movies and series
 Télé Lumière, a Christian television station in Lebanon and the Arab World. Also affiliate station Noursat
 Lumière Film Festival, a film festival in Lyon, France
 Lumière Award (film festival award), an award presented at the Lumière Film Festival
 Lumière! L'aventure commence, a 2017 film edited by Thierry Frémaux.
Lumière, a character in Disney's Beauty and the Beast
 The Lumiere Awards, an annual film awards presented by the Advanced Imaging Society.

Other uses
 Lumiere (horse), a racehorse
 Lumiere festival, the UK's largest light festival
Lumière (restaurant), a restaurant in Vancouver, Canada
Palais Lumière, cancelled skyscraper in Venice by Pierre Cardin
Lumiere (skyscraper), a cancelled skyscraper development in Leeds, England
Lumiere (Black Clover), a character in the manga series Black Clover

See also
 Café Lumière, a 2003 Japanese film
 Luminaire, a light fixture